Avient Corporation is a global manufacturer of specialized polymer materials headquartered in Avon Lake, Ohio. Its products include thermoplastic compounds, plastic colorants and additives, thermoplastic resins and vinyl resins.

History

PolyOne was formed on August 31, 2000 from the consolidation of The Geon Company (Geon) and M.A. Hanna Company (Hanna). The merger between M.A. Hanna Company and The Geon Company in 2000 produced PolyOne Corporation. In 2009, PolyOne was ranked #731 on the Fortune 1000 list and included in the S&P 600 investment index.

Hanna was formed in 1885 as a privately held company focused on mining and shipping and became publicly held in 1927. In the mid-1980s, Hanna began to divest its historic mining and shipping businesses to focus on polymers. Hanna purchased its first polymer company in 1986.

Geon’s roots date back to 1927 when BFGoodrich scientist Waldo Semon produced the first usable vinyl polymer, marketed under the trade name “Geon”. In 1933, Waldo Semon was granted US Patent for PVC (U.S. Patent No. 1929453),
and in 1948, BFGoodrich created a vinyl plastic division that was subsequently spun off through a public offering in 1993, creating Geon as a separate publicly held company.

In October 2019, PolyOne sold its performance products and solutions business unit, renamed to GEON Performance Solutions, to SK Capital.

In 2020, PolyOne acquired a division of Clariant and rebranding to the name Avient, and in 2021 acquired Magna Colours Ltd. for $48 million.

In April 2022, Avient Corporation has entered into an agreement with Royal DSM to purchase the DSM Protective Materials business for purchase price of $1.485B.

References

External links
 
Avient official website

Companies listed on the New York Stock Exchange
Companies based in Ohio
Companies established in 2000
Plastics companies of the United States